The Voyager program is an American scientific program that employs two robotic interstellar probes, Voyager 1 and Voyager 2. They were launched in 1977 to take advantage of a favorable alignment of the two gas giants Jupiter and Saturn and the ice giants, Uranus and Neptune, to fly near them while collecting data for transmission back to Earth. After launch the decision was taken to send Voyager 2 near Uranus and Neptune to collect data for transmission back to Earth.

 the Voyagers are still in operation past the outer boundary of the heliosphere in interstellar space. They collect and transmit useful data to Earth.

On 25 August 2012, data from Voyager 1 indicated that it had entered interstellar space.

On 5 November 2019, data from Voyager 2 indicated that it also had entered interstellar space. On 4 November 2019, scientists reported that, on 5 November 2018, the Voyager 2 probe had officially reached the interstellar medium (ISM), a region of outer space beyond the influence of the solar wind, as did Voyager 1 in 2012.

Although the Voyagers have moved beyond the influence of the solar wind, they still have a long way to go before exiting the Solar System.  NASA indicates "[I]f we define our solar system as the Sun and everything that primarily orbits the Sun, Voyager 1 will remain within the confines of the solar system until it emerges from the Oort cloud in another 14,000 to 28,000 years."

Data and photographs collected by the Voyagers' cameras, magnetometers and other instruments revealed unknown details about each of the four giant planets and their moons. Close-up images from the spacecraft charted Jupiter's complex cloud forms, winds and storm systems and discovered volcanic activity on its moon Io. Saturn's rings were found to have enigmatic braids, kinks and spokes and to be accompanied by myriad "ringlets".

At Uranus, Voyager 2 discovered a substantial magnetic field around the planet and ten more moons. Its flyby of Neptune uncovered three rings and six hitherto unknown moons, a planetary magnetic field and complex, widely distributed auroras. As of 2023, Voyager 2 remains the only spacecraft to have ever visited the ice giants Uranus and Neptune.

In August 2018, NASA confirmed, based on results by the New Horizons spacecraft, the existence of a "hydrogen wall" at the outer edges of the Solar System that was first detected in 1992 by the two Voyager spacecraft.

The Voyager spacecraft were built at the Jet Propulsion Laboratory in Southern California and funded by the National Aeronautics and Space Administration (NASA), which also financed their launches from Cape Canaveral, Florida, their tracking and everything else concerning the probes.

The cost of the original program was $865 million, with the later-added Voyager Interstellar Mission costing an extra $30 million.

History

The two Voyager space probes were originally conceived as part of the Mariner program, and they were thus initially named Mariner 11 and Mariner 12. They were then moved into a separate program named "Mariner Jupiter-Saturn", later renamed the Voyager Program because it was thought that the design of the two space probes had progressed sufficiently beyond that of the Mariner family to merit a separate name.

The Voyager Program was similar to the Planetary Grand Tour planned during the late 1960s and early 70s. The Grand Tour would take advantage of an alignment of the outer planets discovered by Gary Flandro, an aerospace engineer at the Jet Propulsion Laboratory. This alignment, which occurs once every 175 years, would occur in the late 1970s and make it possible to use gravitational assists to explore Jupiter, Saturn, Uranus, Neptune, and Pluto. The Planetary Grand Tour was to send several pairs of probes to fly by all the outer planets (including Pluto, then still considered a planet) along various trajectories, including Jupiter-Saturn-Pluto and Jupiter-Uranus-Neptune. Limited funding ended the Grand Tour program, but elements were incorporated into the Voyager Program, which fulfilled many of the flyby objectives of the Grand Tour except a visit to Pluto.

Voyager 2 was the first to be launched. Its trajectory was designed to allow flybys of Jupiter, Saturn, Uranus, and Neptune. Voyager 1 was launched after Voyager 2, but along a shorter and faster trajectory that was designed to provide an optimal flyby of Saturn's moon Titan, which was known to be quite large and to possess a dense atmosphere. This encounter sent Voyager 1 out of the plane of the ecliptic, ending its planetary science mission. Had Voyager 1 been unable to perform the Titan flyby, the trajectory of Voyager 2 could have been altered to explore Titan, forgoing any visit to Uranus and Neptune. Voyager 1 was not launched on a trajectory that would have allowed it to continue to Uranus and Neptune, but could have continued from Saturn to Pluto without exploring Titan.

During the 1990s, Voyager 1 overtook the slower deep-space probes Pioneer 10 and Pioneer 11 to become the most distant human-made object from Earth, a record that it will keep for the foreseeable future. The New Horizons probe, which had a higher launch velocity than Voyager 1, is travelling more slowly due to the extra speed Voyager 1 gained from its flybys of Jupiter and Saturn. Voyager 1 and Pioneer 10 are the most widely separated human-made objects anywhere since they are travelling in roughly opposite directions from the Solar System.

In December 2004, Voyager 1 crossed the termination shock, where the solar wind is slowed to subsonic speed, and entered the heliosheath, where the solar wind is compressed and made turbulent due to interactions with the interstellar medium. On 10 December 2007, Voyager 2 also reached the termination shock, about  closer to the Sun than from where Voyager 1 first crossed it, indicating that the Solar System is asymmetrical.

In 2010 Voyager 1 reported that the outward velocity of the solar wind had dropped to zero, and scientists predicted it was nearing interstellar space. In 2011, data from the Voyagers determined that the heliosheath is not smooth, but filled with giant magnetic bubbles, theorized to form when the magnetic field of the Sun becomes warped at the edge of the Solar System.

In June 2012, Scientists at NASA reported that Voyager 1 was very close to entering interstellar space, indicated by a sharp rise in high-energy particles from outside the Solar System. In September 2013, NASA announced that Voyager 1 had crossed the heliopause on 25 August 2012, making it the first spacecraft to enter interstellar space.

In December 2018, NASA announced that Voyager 2 had crossed the heliopause on 5 November 2018, making it the second spacecraft to enter interstellar space.

 Voyager 1 and Voyager 2 continue to monitor conditions in the outer expanses of the Solar System. The Voyager spacecraft are expected to be able to operate science instruments through 2020, when limited power will require instruments to be deactivated one by one. Sometime around 2025, there will no longer be sufficient power to operate any science instruments.

In July 2019, a revised power management plan was implemented to better manage the two probes' dwindling power supply.

Spacecraft design
The Voyager spacecraft each weigh . Of this total weight, each spacecraft carries  of scientific instruments. The identical Voyager spacecraft use three-axis-stabilized guidance systems that use gyroscopic and accelerometer inputs to their attitude control computers to point their high-gain antennas towards the Earth and their scientific instruments towards their targets, sometimes with the help of a movable instrument platform for the smaller instruments and the electronic photography system.

The diagram shows the high-gain antenna (HGA) with a  diameter dish attached to the hollow decagonal electronics container. There is also a spherical tank that contains the hydrazine monopropellant fuel.

The Voyager Golden Record is attached to one of the bus sides. The angled square panel to the right is the optical calibration target and excess heat radiator. The three radioisotope thermoelectric generators (RTGs) are mounted end-to-end on the lower boom.

The scan platform comprises: the Infrared Interferometer Spectrometer (IRIS) (largest camera at top right); the Ultraviolet Spectrometer (UVS) just above the IRIS; the two Imaging Science Subsystem (ISS) vidicon cameras to the left of the UVS; and the Photopolarimeter System (PPS) under the ISS.

Only five investigation teams are still supported, though data is collected for two additional instruments.
The Flight Data Subsystem (FDS) and a single eight-track digital tape recorder (DTR) provide the data handling functions.

The FDS configures each instrument and controls instrument operations. It also collects engineering and science data and formats the data for transmission. The DTR is used to record high-rate Plasma Wave Subsystem (PWS) data. The data are played back every six months.

The Imaging Science Subsystem made up of a wide-angle and a narrow-angle camera is a modified version of the slow scan vidicon camera designs that were used in the earlier Mariner flights. The Imaging Science Subsystem consists of two television-type cameras, each with eight filters in a commandable filter wheel mounted in front of the vidicons. One has a low resolution  focal length wide-angle lens with an aperture of f/3 (the wide-angle camera), while the other uses a higher resolution  narrow-angle f/8.5 lens (the narrow-angle camera).

Scientific instruments

Computers and data processing 
There are three different computer types on the Voyager spacecraft, two of each kind, sometimes used for redundancy. They are proprietary, custom-built computers built from CMOS and TTL medium-scale integrated circuits and discrete components. Total number of words among the six computers is about 32K. Voyager 1 and Voyager 2 have identical computer systems.

The Computer Command System (CCS), the central controller of the spacecraft, has two 18-bit word, interrupt-type processors with 4096 words each of non-volatile plated-wire memory. During most of the Voyager mission the two CCS computers on each spacecraft were used non-redundantly to increase the command and processing capability of the spacecraft. The CCS is nearly identical to the system flown on the Viking spacecraft.

The Flight Data System (FDS) is two 16-bit word machines with modular memories and 8198 words each.

The Attitude and Articulation Control System (AACS) is two 18-bit word machines with 4096 words each.

Unlike the other on-board instruments, the operation of the cameras for visible light is not autonomous, but rather it is controlled by an imaging parameter table contained in one of the on-board digital computers, the Flight Data Subsystem (FDS). More recent space probes, since about 1990, usually have completely autonomous cameras.

The computer command subsystem (CCS) controls the cameras. The CCS contains fixed computer programs such as command decoding, fault detection, and correction routines, antenna-pointing routines, and spacecraft sequencing routines. This computer is an improved version of the one that was used in the Viking orbiter. The hardware in both custom-built CCS subsystems in the Voyagers is identical. There is only a minor software modification for one of them that has a scientific subsystem that the other lacks.

The Attitude and Articulation Control Subsystem (AACS) controls the spacecraft orientation (its attitude). It keeps the high-gain antenna pointing towards the Earth, controls attitude changes, and points the scan platform. The custom-built AACS systems on both craft are identical.

It has been erroneously reported on the Internet that the Voyager space probes were controlled by a version of the RCA 1802 (RCA CDP1802 "COSMAC" microprocessor), but such claims are not supported by the primary design documents. The CDP1802 microprocessor was used later in the Galileo space probe, which was designed and built years later. The digital control electronics of the Voyagers were not based on a microprocessor integrated-circuit chip.

Communications
The uplink communications are executed via S-band microwave communications. The downlink communications are carried out by an X-band microwave transmitter on board the spacecraft, with an S-band transmitter as a back-up. The high-gain antenna has a beamwidth of 0.5° for X-band, and 2.3° for S-band. (The low-gain antenna has a 7 dB gain and 60° beamwidth.)

Because of the inverse-square law in radio communications, the digital data rates used in the downlinks from the Voyagers have been continually decreasing the farther that they get from the Earth. For example, the data rate used from Jupiter was about 115,000 bits per second. That was halved at the distance of Saturn, and it has gone down continually since then. Some measures were taken on the ground along the way to reduce the effects of the inverse-square law. In between 1982 and 1985, the diameters of the three main parabolic dish antennas of the Deep Space Network were increased from  dramatically increasing their areas for gathering weak microwave signals.

Whilst the craft were between Saturn and Uranus the onboard software was upgraded to do a degree of image compression and to use a more efficient Reed-Solomon error-correcting encoding.

Then between 1986 and 1989, new techniques were brought into play to combine the signals from multiple antennas on the ground into one, more powerful signal, in a kind of an antenna array. This was done at Goldstone, California, Canberra (Australia), and Madrid (Spain) using the additional dish antennas available there. Also, in Australia, the Parkes Radio Telescope was brought into the array in time for the fly-by of Neptune in 1989. In the United States, the Very Large Array in New Mexico was brought into temporary use along with the antennas of the Deep Space Network at Goldstone. Using this new technology of antenna arrays helped to compensate for the immense radio distance from Neptune to the Earth.

Power
Electrical power is supplied by three MHW-RTG radioisotope thermoelectric generators (RTGs). They are powered by plutonium-238 (distinct from the Pu-239 isotope used in nuclear weapons) and provided approximately 470 W at 30 volts DC when the spacecraft was launched. Plutonium-238 decays with a half-life of 87.74 years, so RTGs using Pu-238 will lose a factor of 1−0.5(1/87.74) = 0.79% of their power output per year.

In 2011, 34 years after launch, the thermal power generated by such an RTG would be reduced to (1/2)(34/87.74) ≈ 76% of its initial power. The RTG thermocouples, which convert thermal power into electricity, also degrade over time reducing available electric power below this calculated level.

By 7 October 2011 the power generated by Voyager 1 and Voyager 2 had dropped to 267.9 W and 269.2 W respectively, about 57% of the power at launch. The level of power output was better than pre-launch predictions based on a conservative thermocouple degradation model. As the electrical power decreases, spacecraft loads must be turned off, eliminating some capabilities. There may be insufficient power for communications by 2032.

Voyager Interstellar Mission 

The Voyager primary mission was completed in 1989, with the close flyby of Neptune by Voyager 2. The Voyager Interstellar Mission (VIM) is a mission extension, which began when the two spacecraft had already been in flight for over 12 years. The Heliophysics Division of the NASA Science Mission Directorate conducted a Heliophysics Senior Review in 2008. The panel found that the VIM "is a mission that is absolutely imperative to continue" and that VIM "funding near the optimal level and increased DSN (Deep Space Network) support is warranted."

The main objective of the VIM was to extend the exploration of the Solar System beyond the outer planets to the heliopause (the farthest extent at which the Sun's radiation predominates over interstellar winds) and if possible even beyond. Voyager 1 crossed the heliopause boundary in 2012, followed by Voyager 2 in 2018. Passing through the heliopause boundary has allowed both spacecraft to make measurements of the interstellar fields, particles and waves unaffected by the solar wind. Two significant findings so far have been the discovery of a region of magnetic bubbles and no indication of an expected shift in the Solar magnetic field.

The entire Voyager 2 scan platform, including all of the platform instruments, was switched off in 1998. All platform instruments on Voyager 1, except for the ultraviolet spectrometer (UVS) have also been switched off.

The Voyager 1 scan platform was scheduled to go off-line in late 2000 but has been left on to investigate UV emission from the upwind direction.
UVS data are still captured but scans are no longer possible.

Gyro operations ended in 2016 for Voyager 2 and in 2017 for Voyager 1. Gyro operations are used to rotate the probe 360 degrees six times per year to measure the magnetic field of the spacecraft, which is then subtracted from the magnetometer science data.

The two spacecraft continue to operate, with some loss in subsystem redundancy but retain the capability to return scientific data from a full complement of Voyager Interstellar Mission (VIM) science instruments.

Both spacecraft also have adequate electrical power and attitude control propellant to continue operating until around 2025, after which there may not be electrical power to support science instrument operation; science data return and spacecraft operations will cease.

Mission details 

By the start of VIM, Voyager 1 was at a distance of 40 AU from the Earth while Voyager 2 was at 31 AU. VIM is in three phases: termination shock, heliosheath exploration, and interstellar exploration phase. The spacecraft began VIM in an environment controlled by the Sun's magnetic field with the plasma particles being dominated by those contained in the expanding supersonic solar wind. This is the characteristic environment of the termination shock phase. At some distance from the Sun, the supersonic solar wind will be held back from further expansion by the interstellar wind. The first feature encountered by a spacecraft as a result of this interstellar wind–solar wind interaction was the termination shock where the solar wind slows to subsonic speed and large changes in plasma flow direction and magnetic field orientation occur.

Voyager 1 completed the phase of termination shock in December 2004 at a distance of 94 AU while Voyager 2 completed it in August 2007 at a distance of 84 AU. After entering into the heliosheath, the spacecraft were in an area that is dominated by the Sun's magnetic field and solar wind particles. After passing through the heliosheath, the two Voyagers began the phase of interstellar exploration.

The outer boundary of the heliosheath is called the heliopause. This is the region where the Sun's influence begins to decrease and interstellar space can be detected. Voyager 1 is escaping the Solar System at the speed of 3.6 AU per year 35° north of the ecliptic in the general direction of the solar apex in Hercules, while Voyager 2s speed is about 3.3 AU per year, heading 48° south of the ecliptic. The Voyager spacecraft will eventually go on to the stars. In about 40,000 years, Voyager 1 will be within 1.6 light years (ly) of AC+79 3888, also known as Gliese 445, which is approaching the Sun. In 40,000 years Voyager 2 will be within 1.7 ly of Ross 248 (another star which is approaching the Sun) and in 296,000 years it will pass within 4.6 ly of Sirius which is the brightest star in the night sky.

The spacecraft are not expected to collide with  a star for 1 sextillion (1020) years.

In October 2020, astronomers reported a significant unexpected increase in density in the space beyond the Solar System as detected by the Voyager 1 and Voyager 2 space probes. According to the researchers, this implies that "the density gradient is a large-scale feature of the VLISM (very local interstellar medium) in the general direction of the heliospheric nose".

Telemetry 
The telemetry comes to the telemetry modulation unit (TMU) separately as a "low-rate" 40-bit-per-second (bit/s) channel and a "high-rate" channel.

Low rate telemetry is routed through the TMU such that it can only be downlinked as uncoded bits (in other words there is no error correction). At high rate, one of a set of rates between 10 bit/s and 115.2 kbit/s is downlinked as coded symbols.

The TMU encodes the high rate data stream with a convolutional code having constraint length of 7 with a symbol rate equal to twice the bit rate (k=7, r=1/2)

Voyager telemetry operates at these transmission rates:
 7200, 1400 bit/s tape recorder playbacks
 600 bit/s real-time fields, particles, and waves; full UVS; engineering
 160 bit/s real-time fields, particles, and waves; UVS subset; engineering
 40 bit/s real-time engineering data, no science data.

Note: At 160 and 600 bit/s different data types are interleaved.

The Voyager craft have three different telemetry formats:

High rate
 CR-5T (ISA 35395) Science, note that this can contain some engineering data.
 FD-12 higher accuracy (and time resolution) Engineering data, note that some science data may also be encoded.

Low rate
 EL-40 Engineering, note that this format can contain some science data, but not all systems represented.This is an abbreviated format, with data truncation for some subsystems.

It is understood that there is substantial overlap of EL-40 and CR-5T (ISA 35395) telemetry, but the simpler EL-40 data does not have the resolution of the CR-5T telemetry. At least when it comes to representing available electricity to subsystems, EL-40 only transmits in integer increments—so similar behaviors are expected elsewhere.

Memory dumps are available in both engineering formats. These routine diagnostic procedures have detected and corrected intermittent memory bit flip problems, as well as detecting the permanent bit flip problem that caused a two-week data loss event mid-2010.

Voyager Golden Record

Both spacecraft carry a  golden phonograph record that contains pictures and sounds of Earth, symbolic directions on the cover for playing the record, and data detailing the location of Earth. The record is intended as a combination time capsule and an interstellar message to any civilization, alien or far-future human, that may recover either of the Voyagers. The contents of this record were selected by a committee that included Timothy Ferris and was chaired by Carl Sagan.

Pale Blue Dot 

The Voyager program's discoveries during the primary phase of its mission, including new close-up color photos of the major planets, were regularly documented by print and electronic media outlets. Among the best-known of these is an image of the Earth as a Pale Blue Dot, taken in 1990 by Voyager 1, and popularized by Carl Sagan,

See also

 Family Portrait
 The Farthest, a 2017 documentary on the program.
 Interstellar Express, a pair of Chinese probes inspired in part by the Voyagers.
 Interstellar probe
 Pioneer program
 Planetary Grand Tour
 Timeline of Solar System exploration

References

External links

NASA sites
 NASA Voyager website – Main source of information.
 Voyager Mission status (updated in real time)
 Voyager Spacecraft Lifetime
 NASA Facts – Voyager Mission to the Outer Planets (PDF format) 
 Voyager 1 and 2 atlas of six Saturnian satellites (PDF format) 1984
 JPL Voyager Telecom Manual
NASA instrument information pages:
 
 
 
 
 
 
 
 
 
 
 
 
 
Non-NASA sites
 Spacecraft Escaping the Solar System – current positions and diagrams
 NPR: Science Friday 8/24/07 Interviews for 30th anniversary of Voyager spacecraft
 Illustrated technical paper by RL Heacock, the project engineer
 
 PBS featured documentary The Farthest-Voyager in Space
 Voyager image album by Kevin M. Gill

 
Missions to Jupiter
Missions to Saturn
Missions to Uranus
Missions to Neptune
NASA programs
Space program of the United States
Projects established in 1977